The Pansy egg or Spinach Jade egg is one of the Imperial Russian Fabergé eggs, and it was commissioned in 1899 by Tsar Nicholas II as an Easter gift for his mother, Dowager Empress Maria Feodoronova. Its design was overseen by the jeweler Peter Carl Fabergé. It is one of only two done in the Art Nouveau style (the other is the Lilies of the Valley egg).

Description
The egg is made of nephrite and has a stand made of gilt silver in the form of branches twisting up about the bottom of the egg (the egg points downward). Around the sides are five pansies with enamelled leaves and petals. The top of the egg – a nephrite dome – lifts off to reveal the egg's surprise.

Surprise
Regarding the "surprise":
Within is a gold easel surmounted by a diamond-set Star of Bethlehem inside a 
wreath over the year; the easel is fluted and embellished with carved gold floral and 
torch motifs and is set with gems and pearls. On it rests a heart-shaped plaque enamelled 
opalescent white on a sun-ray guilloché background and bordered by rose diamonds set 
in silver and surmounted by the Romanov crown also in diamonds. Eleven tiny translucent strawberry enamelled gold covers, each bearing its own monogram, are connected by a large diamond ‘M’ to form a decoration for the front of this plaque.

When a button is pressed, the covers open simultaneously revealing
miniatures of the Imperial Family. Reading vertically, those in the first 
column are:
 Grand Duke George, the Tsar's younger brother and at this time heir apparent to the Imperial throne
 Grand Duke Alexander, the Tsar's brother-in-law via his sister, Grand Duchess Xenia

In the second column are
 the Tsar himself
 Grand Duchess Irina, subsequently Princess Youssoupoff, the Tsar's only niece, daughter of Grand Duke Alexander and Grand Duchess Xenia

In the third column are:
 Grand Duchess Olga Nikolaevna, the first child of the Tsar and Tsarina
 Grand Duchess Tatiana, their second child 
 Grand Duke Michael, youngest brother of the Tsar

In the fourth column are
 The Tsarina, Empress Alexandra Feodorovna
 Grand Duke Andrew, the Tsar's nephew, brother of Grand Duchess Irina

In the fifth column are:
 Grand Duchesses Olga Alexandrovna, sister of the Tsar
 Grand Duchess Xenia, the other sister of the Tsar.

Not shown are the Tsar's three other as-yet-unborn children.

Owners
This egg is among the 10 Fabergé eggs sold by the Russian Antikvariat in 1930, and it was purchased by the Hammer Galleries of New York. The gallery's owner, Armand Hammer, then sold it to the New Orleans oil heiress Matilda Geddings Gray in 1947. She in turn gave it to her niece, Matilda Gray Stream (Mrs. Harold H. Stream, Jr.), as a wedding anniversary present. It is one of the very few Fabergé Imperial Easter eggs to remain in a private collection.

Notes

This egg is one of only two made in the Art Nouveau style; the other is the Lilies of the Valley Egg of 1898.

References

Further reading

External links

 Website by Annemiek Wintraecken, details on each of the Fabergé Eggs

Imperial Fabergé eggs
1899 works